Champagne Salon is a small producer of Champagne made in the blanc de blancs style. Salon, along with Delamotte, is part of the Laurent-Perrier group since 1989.

History
Champagne Salon was founded by Eugène Aimé Salon in the early 20th century. Salon was convinced that the Chardonnay grapes from the Le Mesnil-sur-Oger vineyards could produce wine with favorable levels of finesse and elegance without the need to add Pinot noir or Pinot Meunier. Around the turn of the 20th century, Salon began producing a Chardonnay-only cuvée that he shared privately with friends. The first commercial vintage of Champagne Salon was in 1921 and by 2006, the house has released only 37 vintages under the Salon label. Following Eugène Aimé Salon's death in 1943, his sister inherited the company which was eventually sold to Laurent-Perrier in 1989. Since then, Salon is effectively part of the combined Salon-Delamotte house.

Vineyards and winemaking

Salon is made from 100% Chardonnay. Its grapes are harvested from various growers in the commune Le Mesnil-sur-Oger in the Côte des Blancs subregion of Champagne and from a proprietary vineyard known as Jardin de Salon. While the village-wide terms used for classification in the Champagne region don't carry the same meaning as in Burgundy, Chablis or Alsace, Le Mesnil-sur-Oger is a Grand cru-rated vineyard area, which is the highest of three levels. Of the vineyards that produce their Champagne, Salon's own Jardin de Salon comprises only 1 hectare (2.5 acres) of planted grapes. The majority of the grapes for Champagne Salon comes from the 20 contract growers with vineyards in the Le Mesnil-sur-Oger. These vines average around 25 years of age with some being as old as 40.

Champagne Salon is only released under the Salon name during exceptional years, at the rate of approximately four vintages per decade. Undeclared vintages are used for Delamotte or simply sold off. According to the Salon website, their wines are fermented in stainless steel and allowed to age in the bottle for around ten years before release. Salon vintages are typically first released after 10+ years. Like many Champagne producers, Salon will not release an entire vintage at the same time but will hold back a certain amount to spend more time aging on the lees. In 1988, a single bottle from this vintage fetched over five times its estimated amount at a Christie's auction. In each vintage no more than 60,000 bottles are produced.

One single Champagne is produced under the Salon label.

Vintages
As of January 2019, the most recent Salon that has been released is the 2007, and the following vintages of the 1921 to present day period have been released:

1921, 1925, 1928, 1934, 1937, 1943, 1945, 1946, 1947, 1948, 1949, 1951, 1952, 1953, 1955, 1959, 1961, 1964, 1966, 1969, 1971, 1973, 1976, 1979, 1982, 1983, 1985, 1988, 1990, 1995, 1996, 1997, 1999, 2002, 2004, 2006, 2007. 

Vintages of Salon awaiting future release are: 2008. The 2008 is apparently only going to be released in magnum format (150cl).

See also
 List of Champagne houses

References

External links
 Official website

Champagne producers